Jagdish Sethi was an Indian actor and director.

Filmography

Actor

Director

External links
 

20th-century Indian film directors
Indian male film actors
Year of birth missing
Year of death missing